Weibern is a municipality in the district of Grieskirchen in the Austrian state of Upper Austria.

Geography
Weibern lies in the Hausruckviertel. About 11 percent of the municipality is forest, and 76 percent is farmland.

References

Cities and towns in Grieskirchen District